Avena is a beverage prepared with stewed oatmeal, milk, water, cinnamon, clove and sugar consumed in Latin America and Caribbean. Other spices such as allspice, vanilla, nutmeg, ginger, and citrus peel are popular. Avena means oat in the Spanish language. It is somewhat similar to horchata, a sweet nut milk drink from Spain. 

Avena is prepared using water and milk brought to a boil. Sugar and a small amount of oatmeal are added and cooked. If water is used, some amount of milk may optionally be added at the end of cooking. The oats may then be strained out, blended using a blender, or simply allowed to settle to the bottom of the pitcher. A cinnamon stick is sometimes added to the pitcher.

See also
 Horchata
 Atole
 List of porridges

References

Colombian cuisine
Puerto Rican cuisine
Non-alcoholic drinks
Latin American cuisine
Oat-based dishes
Dominican Republic cuisine